Cayesh is a mountain in the Cordillera Blanca in the Andes of Peru, about  high. It is located between Huaraz and Huari provinces in Ancash. Cayesh lies at the head of the Cayesh valley, northwest of Artisa and southeast of Andavite.

References

Mountains of Peru
Mountains of Ancash Region